This is a list of airports in Bermuda.

Bermuda, officially the Bermuda Islands, is a British overseas territory in the North Atlantic Ocean. Located off the east coast of the United States, its nearest landmass is Cape Hatteras, North Carolina, about 1,030 kilometres (640 mi) to the west-northwest. It is about 1,373 km (853 mi) south of Halifax, Nova Scotia, Canada, and 1,770 km (1,100 mi) northeast of Miami, Florida. The territory consists of approximately 138 islands, with a total area of 71.7 km2 (27.7 sq. mi.). Its capital city is Hamilton.



Airports

See also 

 Transport in Bermuda
 List of airports by ICAO code: T#TX - Bermuda
 List of airports in the United Kingdom and the British Crown Dependencies
 Wikipedia:WikiProject Aviation/Airline destination lists: North America#Bermuda (United Kingdom)

References 
 
  - includes IATA codes
 World Aero Data: Airports in Bermuda
 Great Circle Mapper: Airports in Bermuda
 FallingRain.com: Airports in Bermuda

 
Bermuda
Bermuda
Airports